André Fortin may refer to:

André Fortin (mathematician), Canadian mathematician
André Fortin (politician), current member of the National Assembly of Quebec
André-Gilles Fortin, Canadian member of parliament in the 1970s
Dédé Fortin, musician associated with the rock band Les Colocs